Dmitri Giviyevich Kortava (born 17 November 1990) is a former professional footballer who played as a forward.

Club career
He made his Russian Football National League debut for FC Torpedo Moscow on 6 September 2012 in a game against PFC Spartak Nalchik. He played 4 seasons in the FNL for 4 different teams.

External links
 
 Career summary by sportbox.ru
 

Russian people of Abkhazian descent
1990 births
People from Gagra
Living people
Russian footballers
FC Torpedo Moscow players
FC Fakel Voronezh players
FC Metallurg Lipetsk players
FC Luch Vladivostok players
FC Rostov players
Association football forwards
FC Neftekhimik Nizhnekamsk players
FC Baikal Irkutsk players
FC Sportakademklub Moscow players